This is a list of notable streets in the city of Baltimore, Maryland, United States.

A

B

C

D

E

F

G

H

Heath St. Route 64. (MTA Maryland)

K

L

M

N

O

P

R
Ramsay st

S

U

W

Y

Numbered streets
In Baltimore, numbered streets are found in the north-central part of the city, mostly in the communities of Charles Village, Hampden, and Waverly. The numbered streets, which run west–east, start with 20th Street (excluding 19½ Street, a short alley crossing Howard Street), which runs parallel to and one block north of North Avenue. The highest numbered street in Baltimore is 43rd Street, which runs from York Road several block east to Marble Hall Road near Cold Spring Lane. The numbered streets correspond with the first two digits in address numbers on north–south streets in this part of the city.

See also
List of roads in Baltimore County, Maryland

References

 
Baltimore
Streets
Baltimore